Van Zandt, van Zandt or Vanzandt, is a surname of Dutch origin.

Van Zandt or its variants may refer to:

People
Van Zandt Williams (1916–1966), President of the Optical Society of America and Director of the American Institute of Physics
Billy Van Zandt (born 1957), American playwright and actor
Caitlin Van Zandt (born 1985), American actress
David E. Van Zandt, American academic administrator
Charles C. Van Zandt (1830-1894), Governor of Rhode Island
Ike Van Zandt (1876-1908), American Major League Baseball player
Isaac Van Zandt (1813-1847), a political leader of the Republic of Texas
James E. Van Zandt (1896-1986), U.S. Congressman from Pennsylvania
John Van Zandt (died 1847), American anti-slavery activist
Khleber Miller Van Zandt (1836-1930), Texas business executive, Confederate military officer, and politician
Lindsey VanZandt
Lonnie Lee VanZandt (1937-1995), professor of physics at Purdue University, Indiana
Marie van Zandt (1858-1919), American soprano opera singer
Maureen Van Zandt, actress and wife of Steven
Philip Van Zandt (1904-1958), Dutch actor
Rick van Zandt, American musician (Metal Church)
Steven Van Zandt (born Steven Lento in 1950), American musician and actor
Tim Van Zandt (born 1963), openly gay American politician
Townes Van Zandt (1944-1997), country music songwriter

Fictional characters
Danny Van Zandt, in Degrassi: The Next Generation
Liberty Van Zandt, in Degrassi: The Next Generation

Places
Van Zandt, Washington
Van Zandt County, Texas, United States
Vanzant, Kentucky

See also
Van Sant (disambiguation)
Vansant (disambiguation)
Van Zant (disambiguation)

Dutch-language surnames
Surnames of Dutch origin